Cnaphalocrocis patnalis is a moth in the family Crambidae. It was described by John David Bradley in 1981. It is found in south-east Asia, where it has been recorded from Sri Lanka, India, Malaysia, Indonesia and the Philippines.

The larvae feed on Cynodon dactylon, Cyperus difformis, Cyperus iria, Cyperus rotundus, Dactyloctenium aegyptium, Echinochloa colona, Echinochloa crus-galli, Imperata cylindrica, Leersia hexandra, Leptochloa chinensis, Oryza sativa, Paspalum conjugatum, Paspalum distichum, Paspalum scrobiculatum, Saccharum officinarum, Sorghum bicolor, Sporobolus and Zea mays. Young larvae fold back the leaves longitudinally. They then feed on the green tissues or the green mesophyll layer.

Identification
Body is light brown in color, with black stripes on the wings.

References

Moths described in 1981
Spilomelinae
Insect pests of millets